Marian Zazeela (born April 15, 1940) is an American light artist, designer, calligrapher, painter and musician based in New York City. She was a member of the 1960s experimental music collective Theatre of Eternal Music, and is known for her collaborative work with her husband, the minimalist composer La Monte Young.

Life and work
Born to Russian-Jewish parents and raised in the Bronx, Marian Zazeela was educated at the Fiorello H. LaGuardia High School of Music & Art and Performing Arts and at Bennington College where she studied with Paul Feeley, Eugene C. Goossen and Tony Smith. She earned a Bachelor of Arts degree with a major in painting in 1960.

Shortly after graduation, she relocated to New York City where she provided stage design for LeRoi Jones / Amiri Baraka's The System of Dante's Hell and acted and modeled for Jack Smith (appearing in his film Flaming Creatures and photography book The Beautiful Book), before being introduced in 1962 to composer La Monte Young, with whom she has been associated ever since.

During a period of rapid growth in the early 60s, Zazeela not only joined Young's musical group Theatre of Eternal Music as vocalist (which also included, at various times photographer Billy Name, minimalist musician Terry Riley, musician John Cale, video artist and musician Tony Conrad, and poet and musician Angus MacLise), but also produced for them light shows (among the earliest in the form) which may have inspired Andy Warhol and were contemporaneous to the early work of better-known light-artist Dan Flavin. This work derived from her earlier - more expressionistic - calligraphic canvases and drawings, now taking on a psychedelic aspect by mostly using slides of still images and colored gels blended in exceedingly slow dissolves from one to the next creating optical effects associated with Op Art. In 1965, she titled this body of work the Ornamental Lightyears Tracery, and it was subsequently presented at the Museum of Modern Art, Albright-Knox Art Gallery, Fondation Maeght, Moderna Museet, The Metropolitan Museum of Art, Documenta 5, Haus der Kunst, MELA Foundation, and Dia Art Foundation; among other galleries and museum venues.

Over the next 30 years, Zazeela elaborated this work into increasingly environmental and sculptural forms, often incorporating the use of colored-light and colored-shadow, which she titled Dusk Adaptation Environment (installation), Still Light (sculpture), Magenta Day / Magenta Night (installation/sculpture), and, more generally, Light. Obsessed with duration and color saturation, by the late 60s, Zazeela began presenting light-work in collaboration with Young's minimal music in what were envisioned as long-term installations titled Dream Houses. One of them, at 275 Church Street, above the couple's loft, has run since the early 1990s, and is open to the public four days a week.

In 1970, Zazeela began studies in the Kirana school of Hindustani classical music with Pandit Pran Nath, of whom she has been a devoted disciple ever since. (Pandit Pran Nath died in 1996.) Her "Selected Writings" were published with Young in 1969 and a book on the two of them, with writing on Zazeela by Henry Flynt and Catherine Christer Hennix (edited by William Duckworth), was published in 1996 by Bucknell University Press. A monograph of her drawings was published in Germany in three languages in 2000. In 2020, a retrospective of Zazeela's drawings was exhibited at Dia Beacon.

Discography

 31 VII 69 10:26 - 10:49 PM / 23 VIII 64 2:50:45 - 3:11 AM The Volga Delta [aka The Black Record] - La Monte Young / Marian Zazeela (Edition X, 1969)
 Dream House 78' 17" - La Monte Young / Marian Zazeela / the Theatre of Eternal Music (Shandar, 1974)
 The Tamburas of Pandit Pran Nath - La Monte Young / Marian Zazeela (Just Dreams, 1999)
 Inside the Dream Syndicate, Volume One: Day of Niagara (1965) - John Cale, Tony Conrad, Angus MacLise, La Monte Young, Marian Zazeela (Table of the Elements, 2000. Not authorized by La Monte Young)

See also
Dream House (installation)
Theatre of Eternal Music

References

External links
Marian Zazeela at Mela Foundation
Images of Zazeela graphic design
Text and audio interview with La Monte Young
 Zazeela and Young's Selected Writings, pdf file.
"The Soul of the Word" images and text by Zazeela, from Aspen magazine #9
2003 Interview of Zazeela and La Monte Young by Frank Oteri on Dream Houses
Video clip of Marian Zazeela discussing Pandit Pran Nath
Photos of Marian Zazeela light performance for a performance of cellist Charles Curtis
Biography at eNotes
Biography at Kunst im Regenbogenstadl

1940 births
Living people
20th-century American sculptors
American contemporary artists
Bennington College alumni
Jewish sculptors
Jewish American musicians
American people of Russian-Jewish descent
Pupils of Pran Nath (musician)
American women in electronic music
21st-century American Jews
21st-century American women
21st-century American sculptors
Artists from the Bronx
Sculptors from New York (state)